Flabellina engeli is a species of sea slug, an aeolid nudibranch, a marine gastropod mollusc in the family Flabellinidae.

Subspecies
A subspecies has been described from colder water in Brazil as Flabellina engeli lucianae Dacosta, Cunha, Simone & Schrödl, 2007.

Distribution
This species was described from Curaçao. It has been reported from Tobago, Florida, Costa Rica, Colombia, Venezuela, Barbados, Cuba, Puerto Rico, Curaçao, St. Lucia, Martinique, Granada, Brazil and Panama.

Description

Body is elongate, narrowing posteriorly. Rhinophores are lamellate, club-shaped and with white bands. Cerata are arranged into clusters in two rows along the dorsum. Background color is translucent gray with thick white or yellow patches running between the cerata clusters, on the margin of the dorsum. A submarginal row of opaque white spots present along the sides of the body. Three white or yellow patches are on the head. Oral tentacles are long, translucent and white at the tips. Cerata are translucent with a brown or orange band about a third of the way down from the tip. The maximum recorded body length is 25 mm.

Ecology
One specimen was found on a living blade of sea grass in 1 m of water in Panama. Minimum recorded depth is 1 m. Maximum recorded depth is 2 m.

References
This article incorporates Creative Commons (CC-BY-4.0) text from the reference

External links

Flabellinidae
Gastropods described in 1968
Taxa named by Eveline Du Bois-Reymond Marcus
Taxa named by Ernst Marcus (zoologist)